Basilio Giordano (born February 3, 1952) is an Italian and Canadian politician and journalist. He was a city councillor in the Montreal, Quebec borough of Saint-Leonard from 1982 to 1990 and served in the Italian Senate from 2008 to 2013, representing Italian voters in North and Central America as a member of Silvio Berlusconi's People of Freedom party.

Early life and career
Giordano was born in Frascineto, Calabria. While living in Italy, he studied languages and literature at the Sapienza University of Rome and worked in the Vatican's Congregazione di Propaganda Fide. After moving to North America in 1975, he earned a Bachelor of Arts degree in languages from the Université de Montréal (1980). Giordano's biography indicates that he is fluent in Italian, English, French, and Spanish.

Giordano was a political aide to Saint-Leonard mayor Michel Bissonnet from 1978 to 1980 and continued to work for Bissonnet after the latter's election to the National Assembly of Quebec in the 1981.

City councillor
Giordano was elected to the Saint-Leonard city council in 1982 as a member of mayor Antonio di Ciocco's Équipe du renouveau de la cité de Saint-Léonard. This party dissolved after di Ciocco's death in 1984, and Giordano became a founding member of the successor Ralliement de Saint-Léonard (RdSL) party led by new mayor Raymond Renaud. He was re-elected under the new party's banner in 1986. After an internal party crisis in 1988, he was one of only two councillors to remain aligned with Renaud; the other eight RdSL representatives resigned to sit as independents.

Journalist
Giordano become the editor of Il Cittadino Canadese, a community journal for Montreal's Italian community, in 1986.

In 1997, Il Cittadino Canadese accused Carlo Selvaggi, the Italian consul-general in Montreal, of threatening to end the Italian government's financial support for the paper. Il Cittadino Canadese had previously featured an article that accused the consulate of inaccessibility and inefficiency. Selvaggi subsequently met Giordano for a private conversation about the article, and Giordano recorded their conversation. At one stage, Selvaggi said, "If you wish to continue receiving a financial grant, you must stop publishing articles against the consulate." This was perceived by some as a threat, though Selvaggi later denied this and clarified that only the Italian government could make a decision to cancel funding.

Later political career in Canada
A vocal supporter of Canadian federalism, Basilio criticized an open letter written by fourteen prominent Italian Montrealers in 1996 on the grounds that it allowed for the possibility of the community accepting Quebec separatism. He wanted to seek the Liberal Party of Canada nomination for Anjou—Rivière-des-Prairies in the 1997 federal election, but ultimately chose not to stand against party favourite Yvon Charbonneau. In 2007, he ran for the Liberal nomination in Papineau and finished third against Justin Trudeau.

In 2010, former Member of the National Assembly (MNA) William Cusano was awarded $25,000 in a defamation suit against Giordano and Il Cittadino Canadese. The paper had printed an anonymous letter during the 2007 federal nomination contest that alleged Cusano supported a "non-Italian" (Trudeau) in return for the promise of a patronage job. The letter also made the false suggestion that Cusano had "a tendency toward alcohol." Quebec Superior Court judge Pierre Journet ruled that the letter was "false and defamatory" and that Giordano had become a co-author by changing its content before publication.

Giordano ran as a Vision Montreal candidate for the amalgamated Montreal city council in the 2001 municipal election. He finished fifth in Saint-Leonard's three-member borough.

Italian politician
Giordano was elected to the Italian Senate in the 2008 general election, representing Italian voters in North America and Central America. He served on the foreign affairs committee and the committee for Italians living abroad, and was a supporter of Silvio Berlusconi's government until its resignation in 2011.

He was defeated in his bid for re-election in the 2013 Italian election, when Berlusconi's list finished third in North America and Central America.

Electoral record
Italy

Montreal municipal

References

External links
Senate biography (in Italian)

Living people
1952 births
Quebec municipal councillors
Members of the Senate of the Republic (Italy)
People from the Province of Cosenza
Italian emigrants to Canada
Immigrants to Quebec